Burlington is a federal electoral district in Halton Region, Ontario, Canada, that has been represented in the House of Commons of Canada since 1979.

Geography
It consists of the southern part of the city of Burlington.

The riding serves downtown Burlington and the neighbourhoods of Aldershot, Maple, Freeman, Wellington Square, Dynes, Roseland, Longmoor, Shoreacres, Pinedale, Elizabeth Gardens, Palmer, Mountainside, Brant Hills, and Tyandaga in Burlington.

Demographics
According to the Canada 2021 Census
Ethnic groups: 81.4% White, 4.1% South Asian, 2.6% Black, 1.6% Filipino, 1.6% Arab, 1.7% Chinese, 2.0% Indigenous, 1.6% Latin American

Languages: 79.0% English, 1.6% Spanish, 1.5% French, 1.2% Polish, 1.2% Arabic
Religions: 58.8% Christian (28.3% Catholic, 6.4% Anglican, 5.7% United Church, 2.3% Presbyterian, 2.1% Christian Orthodox, 1.1% Baptist, 12.9% Other), 3.1% Muslim, 1.5% Hindu, 34.5% None.
Median income: $48,000 (2020) 
Average income: $66,100 (2020)

History
Burlington was created in 1976 from Halton—Wentworth.

This riding gained small territories from Halton and Ancaster—Dundas—Flamborough—Westdale during the 2012 electoral redistribution.

Members of Parliament

This riding has elected the following Members of Parliament:

Election results

See also
 List of Canadian federal electoral districts
 Past Canadian electoral districts

References

Federal riding history from the Library of Parliament
Burlington District
 Campaign expense data from Elections Canada

Notes

Ontario federal electoral districts
Politics of Burlington, Ontario
1976 establishments in Ontario